Union Medal may refer to:

Union Medal, the award granted to South African Defence Force members for 18 years of service and good conduct starting in 1952.
Union Medal of the British Ornithological Union, the award granted by the British Ornithological Union in recognition of eminent services to ornithology and to the Union and ornithology.